TVA Films is a privately held Canadian film and television distribution company with offices in Montreal, Quebec and Toronto, Ontario. TVA Films is owned by Groupe TVA, a division of Quebecor Media.

External links

2002 establishments in Canada
Mass media companies established in 2002
Film distributors of Canada
Film production companies of Canada
TVA (Canadian TV network)